Yalman is a village and municipality in the Goychay Rayon of Azerbaijan.  It has a population of 953.

References 

Populated places in Goychay District